The bandtooth conger (Ariosoma balearicum), also known as the Baleares conger or the Balearic conger, is an eel in the family Congridae (conger/garden eels). It was described by François Étienne Delaroche in 1809, originally under the genus Muraena. It is a subtropical, marine eel which is known from the western and eastern Atlantic and the western Indian Ocean, including North Carolina, USA; the northern Gulf of Mexico, northern South America, Canada, Portugal, Angola, the Mediterranean, and the Red Sea. It inhabits reefs and littoral shelves, and burrows into sand and mud. It dwells at a depth range of 1–732 meters, but most frequently between 20–100 m.

The bandtooth conger is of minor interest to fisheries.

References

bandtooth conger
Taxa named by François-Étienne de La Roche
Fish of the Atlantic Ocean
bandtooth conger